Louis Mermillod (born 1894, date of death unknown) was a Swiss cyclist. He competed in the sprint event at the 1924 Summer Olympics.

References

External links
 

1894 births
Year of death missing
Swiss male cyclists
Olympic cyclists of Switzerland
Cyclists at the 1924 Summer Olympics
Place of birth missing